Vadosfa is a village in Győr-Moson-Sopron county, Hungary.
Has a railroad station with "Páli-Vadosfa" name.
Has two temple, an evangelical and an with name of Saint Stephen.

External links 
 Street map (Hungarian)

Populated places in Győr-Moson-Sopron County